John Walter Reeves Jr. (April 25, 1888 – July 16, 1967) was an admiral of the United States Navy who served as the Commander of the Alaskan Sector, Northwest Sea Frontier, during World War II. As such, he led the effort to dislodge Imperial Japan forces from the Aleutian Islands.

Later transferred back to sea duty, Reeves was designated (on 7 Mar 1944), commander, Carrier Division Four (COMCARDIV) Task Group 58.1 hoisting his flag in USS Enterprise (CV-6). Reeves' Task Group 58.3, consisting of the Enterprise, Lexington (CV-16), San Jacinto (CVL-30) and Princeton (CVL-23), played a key role in the Battle of the Philippine Sea on 19–20 June 1944.

Reeves was promoted to vice admiral on April 1, 1949, and advanced to admiral based on his combat service when he retired in May 1950.

A native of Haddonfield, New Jersey, Reeves died at Pensacola, Florida. He is buried in Barrancas National Cemetery.

References

1888 births
1967 deaths
United States Navy admirals
United States Naval Academy alumni
United States Navy personnel of World War I
United States Navy World War II admirals
Recipients of the Navy Distinguished Service Medal
Recipients of the Legion of Merit
Burials at Barrancas National Cemetery
People from Haddonfield, New Jersey
Military personnel from New Jersey